The 1964 Holy Cross Crusaders football team was an American football team that represented the College of the Holy Cross as an independent during the 1964 NCAA University Division football season. Eddie Anderson returned for the 15th consecutive year as head coach, his 21st and final year overall. The team compiled a record of 5–5.

All home games were played at Fitton Field on the Holy Cross campus in Worcester, Massachusetts.

Schedule

Statistical leaders
Statistical leaders for the 1964 Crusaders included: 
 Rushing: Jack Lentz, 802 yards and 6 touchdowns on 146 attempts
 Passing: Mike Cunnion, 734 yards, 41 completions and 6 touchdowns on 92 attempts
 Receiving: Dick Kochansky, 144 yards on 15 receptions
 Scoring: Jim Marcellino, 38 points from 6 touchdowns and 1 two-point conversion
 Total offense: Jack Lentz, 973 yards (802 rushing, 171 passing)
 All-purpose yards: Jim Marcellino, 901 yards (365 rushing, 281 returning, 255 receiving)

References

Holy Cross
Holy Cross Crusaders football seasons
Holy Cross Crusaders football